3J may refer to:
 3J (Family Matters), a character on Family Matters
 3j symbol or the Wigner 3-jm symbols, symbols in quantum mechanics
 Zip (airline)'s IATA code
 Jubba Airways's IATA code
 3J, a type of J-coupling involving 3 bonds in nuclear magnetic resonance

See also
Triple J
 JJJ (disambiguation)
J3 (disambiguation)